Bagh-e Karambeyg (also Romanized as Bāgh-e Karambeyg; also known as Bāqrāmbek) is a village in Sar Firuzabad Rural District, Firuzabad District, Kermanshah County, Kermanshah Province, Iran. At the 2006 census, its population was 201, in 42 families.

References 

Populated places in Kermanshah County